The Shelby Blues were an American football team based in Shelby, Ohio. The team played in the Ohio League from 1900 to 1919. In 1920, when the Ohio League became the APFA (now known as the National Football League), the Blues did not join but continued to play against APFA teams, only to later suspend operations. The Blues returned to play as an independent between 1926 and 1928.

The team was named for their blue uniforms, that were worn in their first year. In 1905, the Blues replaced the Shelby Athletic Club as the top football team in town. A year later the team was the runner-up for the Ohio League title, behind only the Akron Indians. The Blues won Ohio League championships in 1910 and 1911, with Peggy Parratt, an early pioneer and master of the forward pass, at quarterback. In 1904, the Blues are credited with signing the first black player in American professional football, halfback Charles Follis.

Notable Players/Alumni
 Peggy Parratt (BB/QB) - Early pioneer of the forward pass.
 Charles Follis (HB) - First black professional player in American football.
 Branch Rickey - Baseball pioneer, was instrumental in breaking Major League Baseball's color barrier.
 John Miller (HB) - First year captain, would later managed and coached the team. 
 Homer Davidson (BB/K) - Considered to be the best kicker of the era.
 Frank C. Schiffer (Manager) - Signed the first black professional player in American football (Charles Follis).
 Guy Schulz (C) - Brother of Germany Schulz.

References

Ohio League teams
Defunct American football teams in Ohio
American football teams established in 1902
American football teams disestablished in 1928
1902 establishments in Ohio
1928 disestablishments in Ohio